Yaprak Baltacioğlu  (born 1959) is a retired Canadian public servant, lawyer, and professor. She has held senior leadership positions in the Canadian public service, serving as Secretary of the Treasury Board from 2012 to 2018.  Baltacioğlu retired from the public service in 2018, and was appointed as the twelfth Chancellor of Carleton University in 2018.
She is also on the faculty at the School of Public Policy and Governance at the University of Toronto where she teaches graduate courses.

Life and career
Baltacioğlu was born and raised in Ankara, Turkey. She obtained a law degree at Istanbul University before immigrating to Canada in 1980 at the age of 21. After settling in Canada, Baltacioğlu pursued a Master's in Public Administration at Carleton University, which introduced her to a career in the federal public service, beginning as a term employee at the Public Service Commission shortly after earning her graduate degree in 1989.

Baltacioğlu eventually rose to prominent leadership positions across government, and was appointed as Agriculture and Agri-Food Canada's first female Deputy Minister in 2007. She later served as Deputy Minister for Transport, Infrastructure, and Communities from 2007 to 2012 before being appointed Secretary of the Treasury Board, a role which she would fulfill until 2018.

Baltacioğlu was made a member of the Order of Canada in 2021.

References

1959 births
Living people
Canadian people of Turkish descent
Canadian civil servants
Canadian women lawyers
Carleton University alumni
Chancellors of Carleton University
Istanbul University Faculty of Law alumni
People from Ankara
People from Ottawa
Turkish emigrants to Canada
Academic staff of the University of Toronto